The 1946 Troy State Red Wave football team represented Troy State Teachers College (now known as Troy University) as a member of the Alabama Intercollegiate Conference (AIC) during the 1946 college football season. Led by Albert Choate in his seventh and final season as head coach, the Red Wave compiled an overall record of 3–4, with a mark of 3–1 in conference play.

Schedule

References

Troy State
Troy Trojans football seasons
Troy State Red Wave football